The organic compound ethyl acetoacetate (EAA) is the ethyl ester of acetoacetic acid. It is a colorless liquid. It is widely used as a chemical intermediate in the production of a wide variety of compounds. It is used as a flavoring for food.

Preparation
Ethyl acetoacetate is produced industrially by treatment of diketene with ethanol.

The preparation of ethyl acetoacetate is a classic laboratory procedure. It is prepared via the Claisen condensation of ethyl acetate. Two moles of ethyl acetate condense to form one mole each of ethyl acetoacetate and ethanol.

Reactivity

Acidity
Ethyl acetoacetate is diprotic:
CH3C(O)CH2CO2Et + NaH → CH3C(O)CH(Na)CO2Et + H2
CH3C(O)CH(Na)CO2Et + BuLi → LiCH2C(O)CH(Na)CO2Et + BuH

Keto-enol tautomerism
Ethyl acetoacetate is subject to keto-enol tautomerism. In the neat liquid at 33 °C, the enol consists of 15% of the total.

Multicarbon building block
Ethyl acetoacetic acid is a building block in organic synthesis since the protons alpha to carbonyl groups are acidic, and the resulting carbanion undergoes nucleophilic substitution. Ethyl acetoacetate is often used in the acetoacetic ester synthesis similar to diethyl malonate in the malonic ester synthesis or the Knoevenagel condensation. A subsequent thermal decarboxylation is also possible.

The dianion of ethylacetoacetate is also a useful building block, except that the electrophile adds to the terminal carbon.  The strategy can be depicted in the following simplified form:
LiCH2C(O)CH(Na)CO2Et + RX → RCH2C(O)CH(Na)CO2Et + LiX

Ligand
Similar to the behavior of acetylacetone, the enolate of ethyl acetoacetate can also serve as a bidentate ligand. For example, it forms purple coordination complexes with iron(III) salts:

Reduction
Reduction of ethyl acetoacetate gives ethyl 3-hydroxybutyrate.

Transesterification
Ethyl acetoacetate transesterifies to give benzyl acetoacetate via a mechanism involving acetylketene. Ethyl (and other) acetoacetates nitrosate readily with equimolar sodium nitrite in acetic acid, to afford the corresponding oximinoacetoacetate esters. A dissolving-zinc reduction of these in acetic acid in the presence of ketoesters or beta-diketones constitute the Knorr pyrrole synthesis, useful for the preparation of porphyrins.

See also
 Fructone, the ethylene glycol ketal of ethyl acetoacetate, an aroma compound

References

External links
International Chemical Safety Card 1024
Inchem properties database

Ethyl esters
Ester solvents
Flavors
Acetoacetate esters
Sweet-smelling chemicals